Diasemia disjectalis is a species of moth in the family Crambidae. It was described by Zeller in 1852. It is found in South Africa and Zambia.

References

Moths described in 1852
Spilomelinae